Lu Wei (born January 1960) is a former Chinese politician. He served as the deputy head of the Propaganda Department of the Chinese Communist Party, the head of the General Office of the Central Leading Group for Internet Security and Informatization (one and the same with the Cyberspace Administration of China, CAC) from August 2013 to June 2016. Lu was previously Vice-Mayor of Beijing and the head of the Beijing Party organization's propaganda department, among other posts. Lu was named by Time magazine as one of the world's 100 most influential people in 2015. Multiple charges brought in 2017 resulted in Lu being sentenced to fourteen years in prison in 2019.

Biography
Lu was born in Chaohu, Anhui in January 1960. He earned a reputation as being relatively brash and colorful within the Chinese bureaucracy.

In 1991, Lu worked in Xinhua News Agency of Guangxi province as the Deputy Director, he was promoted to become the Director in 1997.

From 2001 to 2004, he rose through the ranks to become Deputy Director of Xinhua News Agency.

In March 2011, Lu was appointed as the Vice-Mayor of Beijing, the Minister of Beijing Propaganda Department and a Standing Committee member of the Beijing Municipal Party Committee. He remained in that positions until April 2013, when he was appointed the Chairman of State Internet Information Office, the Vice-Chairman of State Council Information Office. In August 2013, he became head of the newly created Cyberspace Administration of China in August 2013. 

At the 13th China Internet Media Forum on October 30, 2013, Lu made a presentation that thematized the Chinese Dream, a term that Chinese Communist Party General Secretary Xi Jinping had popularized since late 2012.

Lu visited the United States during the first week of December 2014. In Washington, D.C. he conferred with senior administration officials such as the National Security Council about issues such as alleged Chinese hacking activities and censorship. In Silicon Valley he was greeted warmly by the top management of major firms such as Apple, Facebook, and eBay.

Lu suddenly stepped down from his post at the Cyberspace Administration of China in June 2016, for unknown reasons. While Lu remained a deputy head of the propaganda department, he relinquished all other titles of import. Foreign media speculated that this might signal a shift in Chinese internet policy. Lu was placed under investigation for corruption in November 2017,  making him the first official of provincial rank to be investigated for corruption following the 19th Party Congress. He was expelled from the Communist Party in February 2018. The Central Commission for Discipline Inspection said Lu was “arbitrary and tyrannical”, abused his power for personal gain and pretended to follow the rules. Other offences included using all means to build personal fame, making false and anonymous accusations against others, deceiving the top Communist leadership, extreme disloyalty, duplicity, trading power for sex, improper discussion of the party and a lack of self-control.

On October 19, 2018, the Ningbo Intermediate People's Court heard Lu Wei's bribery case. He took advantage of his position to seek benefit for others and accepted a large sum of money. Lu has been accused of bribing about 32 million yuan. He pleaded guilty to corruption in October. On March 26, 2019, Lu was sentenced to 14 years in prison and fined three million yuan.

References

1960 births
People from Chaohu
Living people
Chinese Communist Party politicians from Anhui
Renmin University of China alumni
Deputy mayors of Beijing
Expelled members of the Chinese Communist Party
Guangxi University alumni
Chinese politicians convicted of corruption
Politicians from Hefei
Xinhua News Agency people